Anne Roiphe (born December 25, 1935) is an American writer and journalist. She is best known as a first-generation feminist and author of the novel Up the Sandbox (1970), filmed as a starring vehicle for Barbra Streisand in 1972. In 1996, Salon called the book "a feminist classic."

Background and education
Roiphe was born and raised to a Jewish family in New York City. She graduated from the Brearley School in 1953 and received her Bachelor of Arts from Sarah Lawrence College in 1957. Roiphe is also a cousin of controversial attorney Roy Cohn

Career
Over a four-decade career, Roiphe has proven so prolific that the critic Sally Eckhoff observed "tracing Anne Roiphe's career often feels like following somebody through a revolving door: the requirements of keeping the pace can be trying." (Eckhoff described the writer as "a free-thinking welter of contradictions, a never-say-die feminist who's absolutely nuts about children"). Roiphe published Digging Out, her first novel, in 1967. Her second, Up the Sandbox (1970), became a national best-seller.

Roiphe has published several novels and two memoirs as well as contributed essays and reviews to [he New York Times, The New York Times Magazine, New York Magazine, and others. In 1993, The New York Times described her as "a writer who has never toed a party line, feminist or otherwise." Her 1996 memoir Fruitful: A Memoir of Modem Motherhood was nominated for the National Book Award.

From 1997 to 2002, she served as a columnist for [The New York Observer. Her memoir Epilogue was published in 2008 and the memoir Art and Madness in 2011. Ballad of the Black and Blue Mind was published by Seven Stories Press in May 2015, and received starred reviews from Publishers Weekly and Booklist.

Personal
Roiphe was married twice. In 1957, she married Jack Richardson; they had one daughter, Emily Carter, then divorced. In 1967, she married Dr. Herman Roiphe; they had two children together: Katie Roiphe and Rebecca Roiphe in addition to Herman's two daughters from a prior marriage, Margaret Roiphe and Jean Roiphe.

Books

Fiction
 Digging Out (1967) 
 Up the Sandbox (1970) , 
 Long Division (1972) , 
 Torch Song (1977) , 
 Lovingkindness (1987) , 
 If You Knew Me (1993) 
 The Pursuit of Happiness (1991) , 
 Secrets of the City (2003) , 
 An Imperfect Lens (2006) , 
 Ballad of the Black and Blue Mind (2015) ,

Non-fiction
 Generation Without Memory: A Jewish Journey Through Christian America (1981) , 
 Your Child's Mind: The Complete Book of Infant and Child Mental Health Care (co-authored with Dr. Herman Roiphe) (1985) , 
 A Season for Healing, Reflections on the Holocaust (1988)
 A Mother's Eye: Motherhood and Feminism (1997) , 
 Married: A Fine Predicament (2002) , 
 Water from the Well: Sarah, Rebekah, Rachel, and Leah (2006)

Memoirs
 Fruitful: A Memoir of Modern Motherhood (1996) , 
 1185 Park Avenue, A Memoir (2000) , 
 For Rabbit, with Love and Squalor: An American Read (2000) , 
 Epilogue: A Memoir (2008) , 
 Art and Madness: A Memoir of Lust Without Reason (2011) ,

References

External links
 The New York Times: Anne Roiphe News
 The New York Observer: Anne Roiphe
 Anne Roiphe on PBS' "The News Hour"; Thoughts on Feminism and Motherhood
 The New York Times: Anne Roiphe and Katie Roiphe

1935 births
20th-century American novelists
21st-century American novelists
American women novelists
American women journalists
American feminists
Living people
Sarah Lawrence College alumni
Writers from New York City
American women essayists
20th-century American women writers
21st-century American women writers
20th-century American essayists
21st-century American essayists
Journalists from New York City
Brearley School alumni
Novelists from New York (state)